Gesneria centuriella is a species of moth in the family Crambidae described by Michael Denis and Ignaz Schiffermüller in 1775. It is found from Europe (Fennoscandia, Estonia, Russia, Poland, Slovakia, the Czech Republic, Hungary, Romania, Bulgaria, Germany, Austria, Switzerland, Italy, France, Iceland), east to Japan. It is also present in Greenland and northern North America.

The wingspan is 20–30 mm. The forewings are smoky gray to dark brown. The hindwings are lighter, smoky gray near the terminus and lighter medially. Adults are on wing from mid June to July in North America.

Subspecies
Gesneria centuriella centuriella (Eurasia)
Gesneria centuriella beringiella Munroe, 1972 (Alaska to British Columbia)
Gesneria centuriella borealis (Duponchel, 1835) (Greenland)
Gesneria centuriella caecalis (Walker, [1859]) (Alaska and Canada to New York, Massachusetts, Oregon, Idaho)
Gesneria centuriella ninguidalis (Hulst, 1886) (Arizona, Colorado, Wyoming, Montana)

References

Moths described in 1775
Scopariinae
Moths of Japan
Moths of Europe
Moths of Asia
Moths of Iceland